Hecke is a German surname. Notable people with the surname include:

Dietrich Hecke (born 1935), German fencer
Erich Hecke (1887–1947), German mathematician
Roswitha Hecke (born 1944), German photographer and photojournalist

See also
Heck (surname)

German-language surnames